The Retrievers is a 2001 television film starring Robert Hays, Mel Harris, Alan Rachins, Alana Austin, Taylor Emerson, Betty White and Robert Wagner. It was directed by Paul Schneider and written by Larry Ketron.

Plot
A family adopts a stray golden retriever, Pilot, who gives birth to puppies. Though the family grow close, they decide to give the puppies away after weaning. However, Pilot is determined to recover them.

Reception
The film achieved a rating of 1.89 million, a record for Animal Planet.

References

External links

2001 films
2001 comedy-drama films
American comedy-drama television films
Films about dogs
Animal Planet original programming
Films directed by Paul Schneider (director)
2000s English-language films
2000s American films